

Crown
Monarch - Queen Elizabeth II

Federal government
Governor General - Michaëlle Jean

Cabinet
Prime Minister - Stephen Harper
Minister of Finance - Jim Flaherty
Minister of Foreign Affairs 
 Maxime Bernier (to May 26)
 David Emerson (October 20-October 30)
 Lawrence Cannon (from October 30)
Minister of National Defence - Peter MacKay
Minister of Health
 Tony Clement (to October 30)
 Leona Aglukkaq (from October 30)
Minister of Industry - Maxime Bernier
Minister of Heritage - Bev Oda
Minister of Intergovernmental Affairs - Rona Ambrose
Minister of the Environment - John Baird
Minister of Justice - Rob Nicholson
Minister of Transport -  Lawrence Cannon
Minister of Citizenship and Immigration - Diane Finley
Minister of Fisheries and Oceans - Loyola Hearn
Minister of Agriculture and Agri-Food - Chuck Strahl
Minister of Public Works and Government Services - Michael Fortier
Minister of Natural Resources - Gary Lunn
Minister of Human Resources and Skills Development - Monte Solberg

Members of Parliament
See: 39th Canadian parliament, 40th Canadian parliament

Party leaders
Liberal Party of Canada - Stéphane Dion to December 10 Michael Ignatieff
Conservative Party of Canada - Stephen Harper
Bloc Québécois - Gilles Duceppe
New Democratic Party - Jack Layton
Green Party of Canada - Elizabeth May

Supreme Court justices
Chief Justice: Beverley McLachlin
Marshall Rothstein
Michel Bastarache
William Ian Corneil Binnie
Louis LeBel
Marie Deschamps
Morris Fish
Louise Charron
Rosalie Abella

Other
Speaker of the House of Commons - Peter Milliken
Governor of the Bank of Canada - David Dodge
Chief of the Defence Staff - General Rick Hillier to July 1 General Walter J. Natynczyk

Provinces & Territories

Lieutenant-governors
Lieutenant Governor of Alberta - Norman Kwong
Lieutenant Governor of British Columbia - Steven Point
Lieutenant Governor of Manitoba - John Harvard
Lieutenant Governor of New Brunswick - Herménégilde Chiasson
Lieutenant Governor of Newfoundland and Labrador - Edward Roberts to John Crosbie
Lieutenant Governor of Nova Scotia - Mayann Francis
Lieutenant Governor of Ontario - David Onley
Lieutenant Governor of Prince Edward Island - Barbara Hagerman
Lieutenant Governor of Quebec - Pierre Duchesne
Lieutenant Governor of Saskatchewan - Gordon Barnhart

Premiers
Premier of Alberta - Ed Stelmach
Premier of British Columbia - Gordon Campbell
Premier of Manitoba - Gary Doer
Premier of New Brunswick - Shawn Graham
Premier of Newfoundland and Labrador - Danny Williams
Premier of Nova Scotia - Rodney MacDonald
Premier of Ontario - Dalton McGuinty
Premier of Prince Edward Island - Pat Binns
Premier of Quebec - Jean Charest
Premier of Saskatchewan - Lorne Calvert
Premier of the Northwest Territories - Joe Handley
Premier of Nunavut - Paul Okalik (January 1 – November 14), Eva Aariak (November 14 – )
Premier of Yukon - Dennis Fentie

Mayors
see also list of mayors in Canada
Toronto - David Miller
Montreal - Gérald Tremblay
Vancouver - Sam Sullivan → Gregor Robertson
Ottawa - Larry O'Brien
Winnipeg - Sam Katz
Edmonton - Stephen Mandel
Calgary - Dave Bronconnier
Victoria - Alan Lowe

Religious leaders
Roman Catholic Archbishop of Quebec and Primate of Canada - Cardinal Archbishop Marc Ouellet
Roman Catholic Archbishop of Montreal -  Cardinal Archbishop Jean-Claude Turcotte
Roman Catholic Bishops of London - Bishop Ronald Peter Fabbro
Roman Catholic Archbishop of Toronto -  Archbishop Thomas Christopher Collins
Primate of the Anglican Church of Canada -  Fred Hiltz
Moderator of the United Church of Canada - David Giuliano
Moderator of the Presbyterian Church in Canada -  Wilma Welsh
National Bishop of the Evangelical Lutheran Church in Canada -  Raymond Schultz

Peer
Michael Grant, 12th Baron de Longueuil

See also
 2007 Canadian incumbents
 Events in Canada in 2008
 incumbents around the world in 2008
 Canadian incumbents by year

2008
Incumbents
Canadian leaders